The Amazing Race Canada is a Canadian adventure reality game show based on the international Amazing Race franchise. Following the premise of other versions of the format, the show follows teams of two as they race across Canada and around the world. Each season is split into legs, with teams tasked to deduce clues, navigate themselves in foreign areas, interact with locals, perform physical and mental challenges, and travel by air, boat, car, taxi, and other modes of transport. Teams are progressively eliminated at the end of most legs for being the last to arrive at designated Pit Stops.

Commissioned and broadcast by CTV, The Amazing Race Canada is hosted by former Olympian Jon Montgomery, produced by Insight Productions in association with Bell Media and with the support of Profiles Television.

After the season 7 finale, it was announced that the show was renewed for an eighth season. Originally expected to premiere in mid-2020, the season's production was postponed until 2022 due to the COVID-19 pandemic in Canada. Season 8 premiered on July 5, 2022 and concluded on September 20, 2022. On November 28, 2022, casting opened for a ninth season.

The Race
The Amazing Race Canada is a reality television competition between at least nine teams of two. Each season is divided into a number of legs wherein teams travel and complete various tasks to obtain clues to help them progress to a Pit Stop, where they are given a chance to rest and recover before starting the next leg twelve hours later. The first team to arrive at a Pit Stop is often awarded a prize while the last team is normally eliminated (except in non-elimination legs). The final leg of each race is run by the last three remaining teams, and the first to arrive at the final destination wins , two vehicles of any Chevrolet model cars and unlimited air travel for a year with Air Canada (seasons 1–3).

On the airdate of the first season finale it was announced that CTV Bell Media had ordered another season of The Amazing Race Canada. Casting began in fall 2013 and the second season aired in summer 2014. New to the eligibility requirements for season 2 were clauses that applicants must possess a valid Canadian passport, and be able to travel not only within Canada but around the world; this meant that, unlike the first season, the show travelled to destinations outside of Canada, closer to its American counterpart.

In the second season, Petro-Canada was the fuel sponsor with the team winning a lifetime supply of gasoline from Petro-Canada, and Scotiabank was the financial sponsor. In the third season, the Bank of Montreal (BMO) replaced Scotiabank as the financial sponsor. In the fourth season, Hotels.com replaced Air Canada as the trip sponsor with the team winning a 'once-in-a-lifetime' trip for two around the world with Hotels.com, and the fuel sponsor was removed. In the fifth season, Sinorama replaced Hotels.com as the trip sponsor with the winning team winning a 'once-in-a-lifetime' trip for two around the world with Sinorama. In the sixth season, the financial and trip sponsors were removed, and Dempster's Bakery began their sponsorship. In the seventh season, Expedia was the trip sponsor and Shell Canada's V-Power was the fuel sponsor. In the eighth season, the fuel sponsor and Dempster's Bakery ended their financial support, while Desjardins Group, Subway Canada, Destination BC, GURU Organic Energy, Tourism Richmond, Trans Canada Trail and Marshalls started their sponsorships, with the once-in-a-lifetime trip for two around the world funded by GURU Organic Energy drinks.

Teams

Each team is composed of two individuals who have some type of relationship to each other. A total of 81 teams, or 162 contestants, have participated in The Amazing Race Canada.

Route Markers

Route Markers are yellow and red flags that mark the places where teams must go. Most Route Markers are attached to the boxes that contain clue envelopes, but some may mark places where teams must go in order to complete tasks, or may be used to line a course that the teams must follow.

Clues

Clues are found throughout the legs in sealed envelopes, normally inside clue boxes. They give teams the information they need and tasks they need to do in order for them to progress.
 Route Info: A general clue that may include a task to be completed by the team before they can receive their next clue.
 Detour: A choice of two tasks. Teams are free to choose either task or swap tasks if they find one option too difficult.
 Roadblock: A task only one team member can complete. Teams must choose which member will challenge the task based on a brief clue about the task before fully revealing the details of the task.
 Fast Forward: A task that only one team may complete, allowing that team to skip all remaining tasks and head directly for the next Pit Stop. Teams may only claim one Fast Forward during the entire race.
 150 Challenge: A series of special challenges during season 5 to commemorate the 150th anniversary of the Confederation of Canada. They had no effect on gameplay mechanics except for their relevance in the Final Memory Challenge that season.

Obstacles

Teams may encounter the following that may affect their position:
 U-Turn: An obstacle where a team can force another trailing team to complete the other option of the Detour they did not select. Teams may use their ability to U-Turn another team more than once throughout each season (as opposed to the American version, which allows only one), as shown in season 3 when Gino & Jesse U-Turned two teams.
 Face Off: An obstacle which has all the teams, two at a time, compete against each other in a specific task. The winning teams are gradually given the next clue, while the final losing team must wait out a 15-minute penalty before receiving the next clue. This was introduced in season 3.
 One Way: An obstacle where a team can force another trailing team to complete one specific option of the Detour. This was introduced in season 7.
 Pass: An obstacle where a team can force a team to wait for another team to get that clue on the pass sign before continuing to race. This was introduced in season 8.

Legs
At the beginning of each leg, teams receive an allowance of cash, usually in Canadian dollars, to cover expenses during the legs (except for the purchase of airline tickets, which are paid-for by credit cards provided to the teams).

Teams then have to follow clues and Route Markers that will lead them to the various destinations and tasks they will face. Modes of travel between these destinations include commercial and chartered airplanes (which for the first three seasons were generally provided by sponsor Air Canada), boats, trains, taxis, buses, and rented vehicles provided by the show, or the teams may simply travel by foot. Each leg ends with a twelve-hour Pit Stop where teams are able to rest and where teams that arrives last are progressively eliminated until only three teams remain. Most legs comprise three or more challenges, often a Roadblock, Detour and a Route Info Task. The first teams to arrive at the Pit Stop win prizes, usually from the show's sponsors.

The Express Pass, awarded to the winners of the first legs of seasons 1, 2, and 8, allows that team to skip any one task. In Season 1, Kristen & Darren won two passes, one for themselves and gave the second one to Vanessa & Celina; Kristen & Darren ultimately did not use theirs. Vanessa & Celina used their Express Pass to bypass the Detour in Leg 4. In Season 2, Natalie & Meaghan won two passes, one for themselves and gave the second one to Pierre & Michel; Natalie & Meaghan used their Express Pass to bypass the Detour in Leg 3. Pierre & Michel used their Express Pass to bypass the Roadblock in Leg 6. In Season 8, Brendan & Connor won three passes, one for themselves and gave one to Jesse & Marika and another to Franca & Nella. Brendan & Connor and Franca & Nella used their Express Passes to bypass the same final task in Leg 7; Jesse & Marika used their Express Pass to bypass the Detour in Leg 6.

In seasons 3 and 4, the Express Pass was given out in an optional task in Leg 2 right before the Detour, allowing any team to possibly win it rather than it being a definite award for a first-place finish on the leg. In Season 3, Hamilton & Michaelia won two passes, one for themselves and gave the second one to Brent & Sean; Hamilton & Michaelia immediately used their Express Pass to bypass the Detour in Leg 2. Brent & Sean used their Express Pass to bypass a task in Leg 7. In Season 4, Steph & Kristen won two passes, one for themselves and gave the second one to Frankie & Amy; Steph & Kristen ultimately did not use theirs. Frankie & Amy used their Express Pass to bypass the Roadblock in Leg 6.

In Season 5, three separate Express Passes were available to be found during the Roadblock in Leg 2, allowing any three teams to possibly win one; or a team could win more than one Express Pass, but they must give the other(s) away by the end of Leg 3. Kenneth & Ryan found all three passes, they gave one to Karen & Bert as a reward for help in a task later in Leg 2, and gave the other to Megan & Courtney early in Leg 3. Kenneth & Ryan used their Express Pass to bypass the Detour in Leg 3; Karen & Bert used their Express Pass to bypass a task in Leg 3; Megan & Courtney ultimately did not use theirs.

In Season 6 (Heroes Edition), three separate Express Passes were available to be found during a task in Leg 2, allowing any three teams to possibly win one. Todd & Anna, Leanne & Mar and Nancy & Melissa each won one. Todd & Anna and Leanne & Mar used their Express Passes to bypass the same task in Leg 3; Nancy & Melissa used their Express Pass to bypass a later task in Leg 3.

In Season 7, three separate Express Passes were awarded; two to the winners of Leg 1, and one to the winners of Leg 2. The team who won two Express Passes on Leg 1 must give one away by the end of Leg 3. Dave & Irina won Leg 1 and two passes; Aarthy & Thinesh won the third pass as a reward for winning Leg 2. Dave & Irina gave their other pass to Anthony & James early in Leg 3. Dave & Irina used their Express Pass to bypass the second Roadblock in Leg 4; Anthony & James used their Express Pass to bypass the first Roadblock in Leg 4; Aarthy & Thinesh ultimately did not use theirs.

Non-elimination legs
Each race has a number of predetermined non-elimination legs, in which the last team to arrive at the Pit Stop is not eliminated and is allowed to continue. The non-eliminated team is required to do a Speed Bump – a penalty task that only the team saved from elimination on the previous leg must complete before continuing on.

Rules and penalties
Most of the rules and penalties are adopted from the American edition.

Seasons
The show first aired in 2013 with the first season premiere airing on July 15, 2013 and ending on September 16, 2013.

Places visited

As of the eighth season, The Amazing Race Canada has visited all of Canada's provinces and territories, in addition to eleven foreign countries in Asia, Europe, South America and North America.

The following are the number of times places (including Canadian provinces and territories) are featured in The Amazing Race Canada.

Canada

International

Notes

 This count only includes provinces and territories that fielded actual Route Markers, tasks & challenges, or Pit Stops. Transport stopovers and connecting flights are not counted or listed.
 Includes 1 Finish Line.
 Includes 2 Finish Lines.
 Includes 3 Finish Lines.
 Including the Special Administrative Regions of Hong Kong (2) and Macau (2).

Reception

Ratings
Until August 28, 2022, all ratings data was provided by Numeris.

Awards and nominations

Canadian Screen Awards

References

External links
 The Amazing Race Canada at CTV

2010s Canadian reality television series
2013 Canadian television series debuts
 
CTV Television Network original programming
Television series by Bell Media
Television series by Insight Productions
Canadian television series based on American television series
2020s Canadian reality television series
Television productions suspended due to the COVID-19 pandemic
Gemini and Canadian Screen Award for Best Reality Series winners
Television shows set in Asia
Television shows set in Europe
Television shows set in North America
Television shows set in South America